The following is a partial list of public universities in Brazil.

Supported by the Federal Government

Supported by State Governments

Supported by Municipal Governments
 Fundação Educacional do Município de Assis
 Municipal University of São Caetano do Sul
 Universidade de Taubaté

See also 
List of universities in Brazil by state
Rankings of universities in Brazil
Universities and higher education in Brazil

 
public
Brazil